Avalanche is a lost 1928 American silent Western film, directed by Otto Brower. It stars Jack Holt, Doris Hill, and Olga Baclanova. It was produced and distributed through the Paramount Pictures company.

Cast
 Jack Holt - Jack Dunton
 Doris Hill - Kitty Mains
 Olga Baclanova - Grace Stillwell (* billed as Baclanova)
 John Darrow - Verde
 Guy Oliver - Mr. Mains
 Dick Winslow - Jack Dunton, age 12

References

External links
 Avalanche at the Internet Movie Database
 

1928 films
1928 Western (genre) films
1928 lost films
American black-and-white films
Avalanches in film
Films directed by Otto Brower
Films with screenplays by Herman J. Mankiewicz
Lost Western (genre) films
Lost American films
Silent American Western (genre) films
1920s American films
1920s English-language films